Halyna Fedorivna Hereha (born 9 August 1959) is a Ukrainian businesswoman and politician who served as acting mayor of Kyiv from 2012 to 2014. Hereha also was a Deputy Mayor and Secretary of the Kyiv City Council from 20 April 2011 to 5 June 2014. She is the co-owner of the store chain Epicentr K along with her husband, Oleksandr Hereha.

Biography
She was born on 9 August 1959 in the village of Hlynets, Yavoriv Raion, Lviv Oblast.

She defended her PhD thesis on "Economic efficiency of shopping malls" in 2015.

In 2011, Oleksandr and Halyna Hereha took 27th place in the ranking of the richest people in Ukraine according to FOCUS magazine with a fortune of $890.8 million. In a similar ranking for 2010, they held 26th place with a fortune of $395.4 million.

In 2012, she ran for the Verkhovna Rada in the G215 constituency (Kyiv, Troieshchyna), but was defeated by Andriy Ilyenko, a candidate from the All-Ukrainian Union of Freedom.

See also
 List of mayors of Kyiv

References

1959 births
Living people
People from Lviv Oblast
Mayors of Kyiv
21st-century Ukrainian politicians
21st-century Ukrainian women politicians
Ukrainian women in business